Joseph Amos Pipal (January 18, 1874 – August 10, 1955) was an American football, basketball, and track and field coach.  He served as the head football coach at Doane College (1902), Dickinson College (1907), the University of South Dakota (1910), Occidental College (1911–1915, 1921–1923), and Oregon State University (1916–1917), compiling a career college football record of 50–35–3. Pipal was credited with devising lateral pass and mud cleats for football shoes and in 1934 wrote a book titled The lateral pass technique and strategy.

Born in Zachotín, Austria-Hungary, Pipal attended Beloit College, the University of Chicago, and Yale University.
He died on August 10, 1955, of a heart attack at his home in Los Angeles, California.

Coaching career

Dickinson
Pipal was the seventh head football coach at Dickinson College in Carlisle, Pennsylvania and he held that position for the 1907 season.   His overall coaching record at Dickinson was 2–6–1.

South Dakota
Pipal coached for one year at the University of South Dakota in Vermillion, South Dakota for the 1910 season, the fourth coach on record at the school.  His record was 5–2.

Oregon State University
In 1916, Pipal took over as the head coach of Oregon State Beavers football, known then as Oregon Agriculutural College.  In his first season as the head coach, Pipal coached the team to a 4–5 record.  This season marked the first time Oregon State played the Nebraska Cornhuskers (on October 21 in Portland, Oregon) and the first road trip to Los Angeles, California to play the USC Trojans.  OAC came up short against Nebraska, 17–7, but defeated the Trojans, 16–7.  Pipal's second season at OAC saw the team go 4–2–1, outscoring their opponents 83–33.

Head coaching record

Football

References

1874 births
1955 deaths
People from Pelhřimov District
People from the Kingdom of Bohemia
Austro-Hungarian emigrants to the United States
American people of Czech descent
Czech players of American football
Beloit Buccaneers football players
Dickinson Red Devils football coaches
Dickinson Red Devils men's basketball coaches
Doane Tigers football coaches
Occidental Tigers football coaches
Oregon State Beavers football coaches
South Dakota Coyotes football coaches
South Dakota Coyotes men's basketball coaches
College men's track and field athletes in the United States
College track and field coaches in the United States
University of Chicago alumni
Yale University alumni
Sportspeople from the Vysočina Region